Büsching is a lunar impact crater that is located in the crater-covered southern highlands of the Moon. It was named after German geographer Anton F. Büsching. The similar-sized crater Buch is located adjacent to its southwestern rim, and further to the southwest lies Maurolycus.

This crater has been eroded by a long history of subsequent impacts, so that the rim has been worn down and the edge rounded. Several small craterlets lie along the edge of the rim, and there is a tiny crater on the interior floor near the east-southeastern rim. The interior floor is somewhat irregular and lacks a central peak at the midpoint.

Satellite craters
By convention these features are identified on lunar maps by placing the letter on the side of the crater midpoint that is closest to Büsching.

References

 
 
 
 
 
 
 
 
 
 
 

Impact craters on the Moon